Tautalus was a chieftain of the Lusitanians, a proto-Celtic tribe from western Hispania. He replaced Viriathus at the last year of the Lusitanian War.

Biography
He is first mentioned to take the mantle of Viriathus after the latter's murder. His participation in the war was short, and he was acknowledged to lack Viriathus's tactic skills. Leading the remnants of Viriathus's army, he marched against the city of Saguntum in the Roman province of Hispania Citerior, besieging it unsuccessfully. After being repelled by the defenders, they turned against Hispania Ulterior, going down the Betis river, where Quintus Servilius Caepio met them with a numerically superior army. Tautalus and the Lusitanians were defeated and forced to surrender their weapons. However, after signing a peace treaty with Tautalus, Caepio assigned them lands in order to make them stop their rebel activities. The Lusitanians were then settled by Decimus Junius Brutus in the colony of Valentia (possibly modern Valença do Minho o Valencia de Alcántara, if not the more geographically distant Valencia).

Etymology 
The name Tautalus, as transmitted by Appian, is recognized to come from the Celtic and Germanic root teu, meaning "people." However, there are doubts about whether Appian meant it to be Tautalus or Tantalus, as in the Hellenic name Tantalus. Similarly, Diodorus transmits the name as Tautamus or Tantamus.

See also 

Viriathus
Audax, Ditalcus and Minurus
Lusitanian War

Notes 

139 BC
Lusitanians
Celtic warriors
Spanish rebels
Year of birth unknown